Ubu Rock is an American musical by composer/lyricist Rusty Magee, with a book by Andrei Belgrader, and Shelley Berc, based on Alfred Jarry's controversial 1896 French play Ubu Roi.  It had its premiere on June 2, 1995 at the American Repertory Theater in Cambridge, Massachusetts. It ran through July 16, 1995 and then again from March 13 to March 23, 1996.

Plot and production

At the urging of Ma Ubu, Pa Ubu seizes power by deposing the royal family of Poland. When the Polish population revolts against the Ubus' kakistocracy, Ma and Pa must flee to America.

The show, in honor of Ubu Rois controversial first word ("merdre"), the show began with an uptempo vocal jazz song, sung by the chorus, with just one lyric: "Shit."

During a war scene, the show features a lengthy "Button Song", in which General Lasky, head of the Polish Infantry, insisted that his troops sing a military cadence involving an increasingly large number of buttons on his jacket. During the American Repertory Theater production run, audience members routinely threw programs, bottles of water, food, and other items at the actors during this scene (angering Lasky and leading him to restart at one button).

Reception

The Boston Globe called the show "scatological, sexually puerile and deliberately offensive, even in the Beavis and Butt-Head age", but said it was "the most entertaining and provocative production of the American Repertory Theatre schedule." 
It similarly praised the 1996 return engagement as "a hands-down, hilarious sendup of contemporary mores and modern musicals."

Artforum International said: "More freewheeling romp than Artaudian bit of cruelty, this musical-theater piece, a burlesque of pop-culture quotations, self-reflexivity, and good old-fashioned scatology, blunts what was once cutting edge," while praising its sight gags as "supremely innovative".

Musical numbers

Act I
 Opening Song (Shit)
 Get What You Want
 We'll Kill Him Good
 My Son
 Song of the Ancestors
 I Am the Dicktator
 We Love Pa Ubu
 Wrong is Just the Same as Right
 I Am Everything There Is
 The Rat Sarabande

Act II
 Let's Go To War
 Ubu Chant
 The Button Song
 Back Together Again
 A New Land is Waiting
 Postlude

Roles

Subsequent productions

Ubu Rock was performed in 2006 at John Jay College and, in 2008, as an "interactive theater" production by Empty Set Productions in San Francisco.

References	

1995 musicals
Musicals based on plays